Tralee District is a Gaelic Athletic Association Divisional Team from Tralee in County Kerry, Ireland. They won Kerry Senior Football Championship three times in a row in 1925, 1926, and 1927. They also won the Kerry Senior Hurling Championship in 1927. The district now only competes at under 14 and under 16 level. The side can select players who represent Austin Stacks, Kerins O'Rahillys and John Mitchels, the other Tralee clubs represent St. Brendan's divisional team.

Honours

 Kerry Senior Football Championship: (3) 1925, 1926, 1927
 Kerry Senior Hurling Championship: (1) 1925
 Kerry Under-21 Football Championship: (1) 2001
 Kerry Under-16 Football Championship: (3) 2006, 2011, 2013

County Championship Winning Captains

Football

1925:  Jer "Pluggy" Moriarty 
1926:
1927:

Hurling

1925: Jer "Pluggy" Moriarty

References

Divisional boards of Kerry GAA
Gaelic games clubs in County Kerry
Gaelic football clubs in County Kerry
Hurling clubs in County Kerry